Crozet may refer to:

 Crozet Islands, a sub-antarctic archipelago of small islands in the southern Indian Ocean, part of the French Southern Territories
 Crozet, a commune in France of the Ain département, in France
 Crozet, Virginia, a census-designated place, United States
 Benoit Claudius Crozet, educator and civil engineer (1789-1864)
 Crozets de Savoie, a type of pasta